Nucleolar protein 58 is a protein that in humans is encoded by the NOP58 gene.

References

Further reading